Lodosa is a small town of around 5,000 people located in the province and autonomous community of Navarre, northern Spain. Located along the river Ebro, in a largely agricultural area, the town of Lodosa is known for its piquillo peppers (pimientos del piquillo), and its natural environment. The largest nearby city is Pamplona.

References

Municipalities in Navarre